Telmatobius niger is a species of frog in the family Telmatobiidae. It is endemic to the Andes of Ecuador, with records from both Amazonian and Pacific versants. Last seen in 1994, it is feared that this species may be extinct. Common name black water frog has been coined for it.

Description
Adult males measure  and adult females  in snout–vent length. The head is large. The tympanic annulus may be present, reduced, or absent; the right and left side of a single individual may show different state. The fingers have no webbing whereas the toes are webbed; the degree of webbing varies among individuals. The dorsum has either uniform color or subtle mottling or indistinct spots; the former is more typical. The background color ranges from reddish brown to brownish gray. Mottling spots can be tan, gray, or dark brown. Ventral coloration is similarly variable, but the patterning, when present, is stronger.

Habitat and conservation
During daytime, adults usually occur beneath rocks and in weedy vegetation in and at the edge of streams. Breeding takes place in streams.

This species was formerly reasonably common and is historically known from several locations. However, it has declined dramatically and might now be extinct. The last record is from  Lagunas de Atillo (Chimborazo Province) in December 1994. Later surveys to historic sites have not resulted in any new records. The possible reasons for the decline include disease and parasites (e.g., chytridiomycosis), abnormal climatic conditions, and habitat destruction and degradation caused by agricultural development and human settlement. 
Traditionally, species in the genus Telmatobius have also been collected for food. Parts of the historic range fall within national parks, notably El Cajas National Park.

References

niger
Amphibians of the Andes
Amphibians of Ecuador
Endemic fauna of Ecuador
Amphibians described in 1920
Taxa named by Thomas Barbour
Taxa named by Gladwyn Kingsley Noble
Taxonomy articles created by Polbot